Frances Laughton Mace ( Frances Parker Laughton; pen name: Inez; January 15, 1836 – July 20, 1899) was an American poet. Her poems first appeared in The Journal of Commerce. She was best remembered for the poem and hymn "Only Waiting", written when she was 18, and published in the Waterville Mail. Its authorship, for a time, was confused. The work was included in her volume Legends, Lyrics, and Sonnets (Boston, 1883). Her later work was included in Under Pine and Palm (1888) and Wild Roses of Maine (1896). Mace died in 1899.

Early life and education
Frances Parker Laughton was born in Orono, Maine, January 15, 1836. Her father was Dr. Sumner Laughton. Her grandfather, John Laughton, was one of the early settlers of Norridgewock, Maine. Her siblings included Edward Sumner (born 1838), Henry Herbert, and Frederick Malvern (born 1844).

In 1837, the family moved to Foxcroft where she was educated. At the age of 10, she studied Latin and other advanced subjects. At the age of 12, she wrote verses that were published. Some of them appeared in the New York "Journal of Commerce." After the family moved to Bangor, she took courses in German and music with private teachers, and graduated from Bangor High School in 1852. Of her early years, she recollected, "Mine was a silent dreamy childhood haunted by visions of impossible poems."

Career
At the age of 18, Mace published her best-known hymn, "Only Waiting till the shadows" in the Waterville, Maine Mail, under the signature "Inez", the text of which was developed after a friend's recital of the story of a very aged man at the alms-house, who, being asked what he was doing now, replied, "Only waiting!" Her hymn became popular in the United States and Britain, and its authorship was disputed, by a certain U.S. woman, whose right for a time was almost unquestioned. In 1878, 25 years after its first appearance, full proofs of Mace's authorship were accepted by Dr. James Martineau.

In 1855, she married Benjamin F. Mace, a lawyer of Bangor, remaining in that city until 1885, when they removed to San Jose, California, residing at Palmtree Lodge. Four of her eight children died young. After the eighth child turned two, she began writing again after a quiet period of about 20 years. "Israfil" appeared, with illustrations, in Harper's Magazine, gaining for her quick recognition and advancing her toward the front rank of singers. After that, her poems found place in the leading magazines and journals, including Century, Atlantic, and Lippincott's. 

In 1883, she published a collection of poems in a volume entitled Legends, Lyrics and Sonnets, soon followed by a second edition, enlarged and extended. In 1888, a volume of work was published with the title Under Pine and Palm, adding to her reputation.

Death
Frances Laughton Mace died in Los Gatos, California on July 20, 1899, aged 63.

Literary review
In Cottage Hearth: A Magazine of Home Arts and Home Culture of 1885, Augusta Moore spoke up regarding the poem, "Only Waiting":—

Selected works
 A poem, 1880
 Legends, lyrics and sonnets, 1883
 Under pine and palm, 1887
 Wild Roses of Maine, 1896

Hymns
 "In counting all the precious boons"
 "Only waiting till the shadows"
 "Throw open the gates"

Notes

References

Attribution

External links
 
 
 Frances Mace poetry at Harper's Magazine
 Frances Mace poetry at The Cambridge Book of Poetry and Song
 France Mace poetry at American Sonnets

1836 births
1899 deaths
19th-century American poets
19th-century American women writers
19th-century American women musicians
19th-century pseudonymous writers
People from Orono, Maine
American women poets
American hymnwriters
Pseudonymous women writers
American women hymnwriters
Wikipedia articles incorporating text from A Woman of the Century